Alexander Ribbenstrand (born January 9, 1987) is a Swedish professional ice hockey defenceman. He is currently an unrestricted free agent who most recently played with SønderjyskE Ishockey in the Danish Metal Ligaen.

Ribbenstrand made his Elitserien debut playing with Djurgårdens IF Hockey during the 2005–06 Elitserien season.

References

External links

1987 births
Living people
Almtuna IS players
Ässät players
IF Björklöven players
Djurgårdens IF Hockey players
Lørenskog IK players
Malmö Redhawks players
Mora IK players
SønderjyskE Ishockey players
Swedish ice hockey defencemen
VIK Västerås HK players
Ice hockey people from Stockholm